Monroe Township is one of twenty townships in Benton County, Iowa, USA.  As of the 2000 census, its population was 259.

History
Monroe Township was founded in 1851.

Geography
According to the United States Census Bureau, Monroe Township covers an area of 36.31 square miles (94.04 square kilometers); of this, 36.3 square miles (94.01 square kilometers, 99.97 percent) is land and 0.01 square miles (0.03 square kilometers, 0.03 percent) is water.

Adjacent townships
 Bruce Township (north)
 Cedar Township (northeast)
 Jackson Township (east)
 Big Grove Township (southeast)
 Homer Township (south)
 Oneida Township, Tama County (southwest)
 Clark Township, Tama County (west)
 Geneseo Township, Tama County (northwest)

Cemeteries
The township contains these four cemeteries: Gnagy, Ramthun, Saint Joseph and Urmy.

Major highways
  U.S. Route 218
  Iowa Highway 8

School districts
 Union Community School District
 Vinton-Shellsburg Community School District

Political districts
 Iowa's 3rd congressional district
 State House District 39
 State Senate District 20

References
 United States Census Bureau 2007 TIGER/Line Shapefiles
 United States Board on Geographic Names (GNIS)
 United States National Atlas

External links

 
US-Counties.com
City-Data.com

Townships in Benton County, Iowa
Cedar Rapids, Iowa metropolitan area
Townships in Iowa
1851 establishments in Iowa
Populated places established in 1851